The Golden Lotus is a 1974 Hong Kong sex film directed and written by Li Han-hsiang, and produced by Run Run Shaw. The film stars Peter Yang, Hu Jin, Tien Lie, and Chen Ping. Hong Kong Kung fu star Jackie Chan made his film debut in this film and had a minor role as Brother Yun. The film premiered in Hong Kong on 17 January 1974.

Cast
Peter Yang as Ximen Qing.
Hu Jin as Pan Jinlian.
 as Li Ping'er.
Chen Ping as Pang Chunmei

Other
Wang Lai as Matchmaker Wang.
Jiang Nan as Wu Dalang.
Tian Qing as Hua Zixu.
Dean Shek as Jiang Zhushan.
Jackie Chan as Brother Yun.
Liu Wuqi as Wu Yin'er.
Xu Yu as Wu Yueniang.
Gu Qiuqin as Li Jiao'er.
Jiang Ling as Meng Yulou.
Apple Xia as Sun Xue'e.
Wong Yue as the servant.
Liu Huiling as Ying Chun.

Release
It was released in Hong Kong on 17 January 1974.

Critical response 
Critics appraised the film is in accordance with the original novel and Hu Jin's acting is perfect.

References

External links

1970s Mandarin-language films
Hong Kong erotic films
Films based on Jin Ping Mei
Films set in Hebei
Films directed by Li Han-hsiang
1970s Hong Kong films